Ameltolide, a 4-aminobenzamide derivative, is an experimental anticonvulsant agent, effective at inhibiting seizures in animal models. It is non-toxic at dosing levels and no undesirable side effects are attributable to its application.

References 

Anticonvulsants
Benzanilides